Terrorism and Kebab (transliterated: Al-irhab wal kabab) is a popular 1992 Egyptian black comedy film starring Adel Emam.

Plot
 The action primarily takes place in The Mogamma in Cairo, a well-known mammoth-sized government building that is a center of bureaucratic work.  Adel Imam's character, Ahmed, queues up at the Mogamma one day to try to get a school transfer for his children, but gets bogged down.  Endless lines of citizens march through the building and up and down its iconic spiral staircases seeking help.  One government worker frustrates Ahmed particularly, because he is constantly praying in a show of alleged piousness to avoid getting any work done.  This leads to a scuffle between the two, and eventually Ahmed ends up with a rifle from a guard and shots are fired in the resulting confusion.  A mass spontaneous evacuation of the building ensues, Ahmed inadvertently takes the building hostage, and subsequently is assumed to be a terrorist.  He is joined in his "takeover" by a few other "misfits," including Hind, a prostitute played by Yousra.

Ahmed and his new compatriots negotiate with the Minister of Interior, who fears the building will be blown up, and he demands kebab for all the hostages, as meat is too expensive for most Egyptians.  Writer Wahid Hamed has described the symbolic meaning of the demand:  "People don't know what they want ... They are crushed, their dreams are impossible, they can't believe their demands can be fulfilled, so they ask for kebab."

As the film draws to a close, Ahmed orders the "hostages" to leave the building, and he will wait behind to meet up with the military police now ready to swarm the building, assuming he will be killed.   The crowd, however, insists that he leave with them.  Ahmed walks out unnoticed among his former "hostages", and the commandos find the building empty.

Reception
The film has been described as a "classic Egyptian comedy about government corruption, bumbling and the good hearted nature of the sha'ab (people) of Egypt."  The film was a great success, and has even been cited as the most popular Egyptian film of all time.  A 2007 poll of Egyptian critics taken by Al-Ahram newspaper listed the film as No. 15 on the 15 best Egyptian films of all time.

Cast
Adel Emam - Ahmed
Yousra - Hind
Kamal el-Shennawi - Minister of Interior
Ahmed Rateb - Shalabi

References

External links
 
 DVD AT AMAZON STORE

Films set in Egypt
1992 films
1990s Arabic-language films
1990s black comedy films
Egyptian black comedy films
1992 comedy films
Films about terrorism in Africa